Michel-Paul Guy de Chabanon (1730, Saint-Domingue – 10 June 1792, Paris) was a violinist, composer, music theorist, and connoisseur of French literature. He was elected to the Académie des inscriptions et belles-lettres (1760) and the Académie française (1779).

Biography

As fiction writer 
Michel Paul Guy de Chabanon wrote poetry, elegies (notably that of Rameau), plays (including the tragedy of Éponine) and translations (adjudged by the 19th century Dictionnaire Bouillet as having "little fidelity [to the original text], but not lacking in elegance and facility").

As musician and music theorist 
Michel Paul Guy de Chabanon was also a successful musician, playing the violin in the Concert des Amateurs under the direction of Joseph Bologne, chevalier de Saint-Georges.

He was the author of an opera, Sémélé, tragédie lyrique, and of several works on music theory, of which the most valued are his commentaries on music in the work of Aristotle
. His double identity as a writer and a musician gave him a unique viewpoint on the links between music and language and in developing a philosophy of music of which his work was the expression. He also contributed to defining opera as a musical genre.

Works

Translations 

 Pindare (1771)
 Théocrite (1775)
 Horace (1773).

Works on music esthetics 

 1779 : Observations sur la musique, et principalement sur la métaphysique de l'art (Paris, 1779; translated by Weber in German as Ueber die Musik und deren Wirkungen, aus dem franz. übersetzt mit Anmerkungen, Leipzig, 1781)
 1785 : Sur l'introduction des accords dans la musique des anciens, Mémoire
 1785 : De la musique considérée en elle-même et dans ses rapports avec la parole, les langues, la poésie, et le théâtre (Paris)1785).

Libretti 
Sabinus (1773)

References

External links

18th-century French male classical violinists
People of Saint-Domingue
Latin–French translators
Greek–French translators
French classical scholars
18th-century French poets
French male classical composers
French opera composers
Male opera composers
Members of the Académie des Inscriptions et Belles-Lettres
18th-century French dramatists and playwrights
French music theorists
18th-century French male writers
Haitian people of French descent
1730 births
1792 deaths
18th-century classical composers
18th-century French composers
Writers about music
18th-century French translators